Muhammad Kutty Panaparambil Ismail (/muhɐmːɐd̪ kuʈːi pɐnɐpːɐrɐmbil ismɐjl/; born 7 September 1951), known mononymously by the hypocorism Mammootty (/mɐmːuːʈːi/), is an Indian actor and film producer who works predominantly in Malayalam films. He has also appeared in Tamil, Telugu, Kannada, Hindi, and English-language productions. In a career spanning five decades, he has acted in over 400 films. He is the recipient of several accolades, including three National Film Awards, seven Kerala State Film Awards, and thirteen Filmfare Awards South. For his contribution to film, the Government of India awarded him the Padma Shri in 1998. In 2022, he was honoured with Kerala Prabha Award, the second-highest honour given by the Government of Kerala.

Mammootty made his debut in acting through Malayalam film Anubhavangal Paalichakal in 1971. His first leading role was in I. V. Sasi's unreleased film Devalokam (1979). Mammootty's breakthrough came in 1981 when he received the Kerala State Film Award for Second Best Actor for his performance in Ahimsa. Major commercial successes during this time included the 1983 films Sandhyakku Virinja Poovu and Aa Raathri. Following a series of box office failures, the 1987 crime thriller New Delhi improved his commercial prospects. The films that followed through the next decade established Mammootty as one of the leading stars of Malayalam cinema.

The 2000s were a period of critical and commercial success for Mammootty. His performance in the Hindi and English-language bilingual biopic Dr. Babasaheb Ambedkar (2000) won him the National Film Award for Best Actor, and he won Kerala State Film Awards for Kaazcha (2004) and Paleri Manikyam (2009). He garnered further critical praise for the satire Pranchiyettan & the Saint (2010), drama Varsham (2014), period drama Pathemari and black comedy Unda (2019), and received Filmfare Awards for Best Actor for the first three. His highest-grossing releases include the period action Mamangam and Madhura Raja in 2019, and the action thriller Bheeshma Parvam in 2022.

Mammootty is the chairman of Malayalam Communications, which runs the Malayalam television channels Kairali TV, Kairali News and Kairali We. He is the owner of multiple production ventures, including the distribution-production banner Playhouse and the Mammootty Kampany.

Early life and family 

Mammootty was born on 7 September 1951 in Chandiroor. He was raised in the village of Chempu near Vaikom in Kottayam district in the present-day state of Kerala, India in a middle-class Muslim family. His father, Ismail, had a wholesale garment and rice business and was involved in rice cultivation. His mother, Fatima, was a housewife. He is their eldest son. He has two younger brothers, Ibrahimkutty and Zakariah, and three younger sisters, Ameena, Sauda and Shafina.

He went to Government High School, Kulasekharamangalam, Kottayam for his primary education. In the 1960s, his father moved the family to Ernakulam, where he attended Government School Ernakulam. He did his pre-university course (pre-degree) at Sacred Heart College, Thevara. He attended Maharaja's College, Ernakulam, for his degree. He graduated with an LL.B. from Government Law College, Ernakulam. He practised law for two years in Manjeri.

He married Sulfath Kuttyy in 1979 in an arranged marriage. The couple had a daughter Surumi (born 1982), and a son Dulquer Salmaan (born 1986)—also an actor. He resides in Kochi with his family. Though his younger brother, Ibrahimkutty acted in Malayalam films, his nephews Maqbool Salmaan and Ashkar Saudan are Malayalam films and Television actors.

Acting career
Mammootty's debut was in 1971, as a junior artist in the film Anubhavangal Paalichakal, directed by K. S. Sethumadhavan. His second film was Kaalachakram, a 1973 Malayalam film directed by K. Narayanan, where he said his first dialogue. He acted in the theatre drama Sabarmathi in 1975. In 1979, he played his first lead role in Devalokam, directed by M. T. Vasudevan Nair. However, this film was never completed. His first credited role was in the 1980 film Vilkkanundu Swapnangal, directed by Azad and written by M. T. Vasudevan Nair. Mammootty's first starring role in a released film was the 1980 film Mela, written and directed by K. G. George.

1980–1982

In this phase, Mammootty was slowly building his career. In 1981 he starred in Sphodanam (directed by P. G. Viswambharan), in which his name appeared in the credits as "Sajin" and in some following films. During the shooting of Sphodanam he got injured in his leg. Munnettam (directed by Sreekumaran Thampi) was his next release. In the same year he worked in Thrishna directed by I.V. Sasi along with Ratheesh. This movie give Mammootty his first major break as a solo hero. In 1981, he got his first state award in the Best Supporting Actor category for his performance in Ahimsa. His performances included Aalkkoottathil Thaniye and Adiyozhukkukal in the same year.

He started in 1982 as a police officer in the investigative thriller Yavanika (1982), directed by K. G. George, which was both a commercial and critical success, and it is one of the finest investigative thrillers ever made in Malayalam cinema. Other major releases in 1982 were Padayottam and Ee Nadu, the latter of which was a commercial success and became the highest-grossing South Indian film at that time. Ee Nadu was remade in Telugu with the same name, in Tamil as Idhu Enga Naadu—1983 and in Hindi as Yeh Desh—1984. In 1983 he joined with the Director P. G. Viswambharan for the movie Sandhyakku Virinja Poovu where he played the role of an advocate named "Jayamohan".

1983–1986
In a period of five years, from 1982 to 1987, Mammootty acted in the lead role in more than 150 films. In 1983, he collaborated with director Joshiy for the first time on the movie Aa Raathri, which was both a commercial and critical success. In 1984, he starred in Athirathram, directed by I. V. Sasi, which elevated Mammootty to superstardom. He played the character Tharadas, who is a smuggler and the film was a commercial success. For his performance in the movie Adiyozhukkukal in 1984, he won the Best Actor award at both the Kerala State Film Awards and the Filmfare Awards. The following year, he won the Filmfare Best Actor Award for his performance in Yathra, as well as a Special Jury Award for his performances in both Yathra and Nirakkoottu. Nirakkoottu has won the Best Malayalam Movie award at the Filmfare Awards. In 1986 alone, he acted in about 35 films, including a brief appearance in Mazha Peyyunnu Maddalam Kottunnu. In 1986, he teamed up with I. V. Sasi for the film Aavanazhi, which was written by T. Damodaran. Mammootty appears in the lead role as Balram, a police officer. Both Inspector Balram and Balram vs. Tharadas are sequels to this film. The film was a huge hit at the box office. The film ran for over 200 days. The film was remade in Tamil, Telugu, and Hindi.

1987–1990
Following a series of flops, Mammootty found commercial success with the crime thriller New Delhi (1987), directed by Joshiy and written by Dennis Joseph. He played G. Krishnamoorthy, a victimised journalist who systematically arranges the killing of politicians who had implicated him under false charges. New Delhi was a commercial success, becoming the highest-grossing Malayalam film released at that point. After its release, Rajinikanth, wanting to remake the film in Tamil, offered to buy the rights from Joseph, but the rights for Kannada, Telugu and Hindi-language remakes were already sold by that time. In the same year, he played Balagopalan, a school teacher who is deemed mad by society owing to a superstitious belief, in the drama Thaniyavarthanam, directed by Sibi Malayil and written by A. K. Lohithadas. It won the Filmfare Award for Best Film – Malayalam at the Filmfare Awards South. Mammootty's performance received acclaim from film critics.

In the first of his several releases in 1988, Mammootty appeared in the comedy film Manu Uncle, directed by Dennis Joseph. Mohanlal and Suresh Gopi made cameo appearances in the film. It received the National Film Award for Best Children's Film at the 36th National Film Awards. Mammootty played an investigator called Sethurama Iyer in another film, Oru CBI Diary Kurippu, which served as the first instalment in the CBI series. The film set box office records both in Kerala and Tamil Nadu. The film's one-year theatrical run in Tamil Nadu continues to remain an all-time record. That year, he also appeared in the Sibi Malayil-directed action film August 1, which was based on the novel The Day of the Jackal, by Frederick Forsyth. The film's rights were sold in Tamil Nadu for a record-breaking price at the time. Additionally, Mammootty and I. V. Sasi worked together on three projects in the same year: the romantic film Abkari, the drama Mukthi and the war film 1921. In the latter, Mammootty played Khader, a World War I veteran who joins the Malabar rebellion. The film, which cost over 1.2 crore to produce, earned 2 crore during its theatrical run. In 1988, Mammootty collaborated with Joshiy for two films, Sangham and Thanthram.

The following year, Mammootty starred with Rahman and Shobana in the G. S. Vijayan thriller film Charithram. The story is adapted from the English movie Chase a Crooked Shadow. The story is about the relationship between two brothers. In the same year, he acted in a film which is considered as one of the best crime thriller in Malayalam cinema, Adikkurippu, written by S. N. Swamy and directed by K. Madhu. In 1989, Mammootty starred in the lead as Chandu Chekavar, in the epic historical drama film Oru Vadakkan Veeragatha, directed by Hariharan and written by M. T. Vasudevan Nair. The movie has won four National Film Awards, including Best Actor(Mammootty), Best Screenplay(M.T Vasudevan Nair), Best Production Design and Best Costume Design(P. Krishnamoorthy). The movie has selected as Best Malayalam Movie in Filmfare Awards, also the movie has won seven Kerala State Film Awards. The movie received both commercial and critical acclaim and ran for over 300 days. It is considered as one of the greatest films of all time. In an online poll conducted in 2013 by IBN Live, as a part of Indian Cinema completing 100 years, Oru Vadakkan Veeragatha listed as the third greatest Indian Film of all time. In the same year, Mammootty starred with Sukumaran in the Mystery-thriller film Utharam, written by M. T. Vasudevan Nair. The story was based on the short story No Motive by Daphne du Maurier. Utharam is considered as one of the best investigate thrillers in Malayalam cinema. Second movie in CBI (film series), Jagratha released in the same year. It is considered as one of the best investigate thrillers in Malayalam. In the same year Mammootty joined with Joshiy, in the movie Mahayanam, which was a critical and commercial success. In 1989, Mammootty appeared as hunter in Mrigayaa, Directed by I. V. Sasi and written by A. K. Lohithadas. The movie was a major success and I.V Sasi won the Kerala State Award for Best Director. In 1989, Mammootty won the Best Actor Award in Kerala State Film Awards for the movies Oru Vadakkan Veeragatha, Mrigayaa and Mahayanam.

In 1990, he starred in Kottayam Kunjachan, an action-comedy film directed by T. S. Suresh Babu and written by Dennis Joseph. The movie has become one of the highest-grossing film in the year. Mammootty played the role Kunjachan which is a character from the novel Veli written by Muttathu Varkey. Mammootty made his Tamil debut the same year with Mounam Sammadham. N. Krishnaswamy of The Indian Express wrote, "Mammootty plays the no-nonsense hero in the film with such dignity, poise and grace." Mammootty won Best Actor Award in National Film Award in 1990 for the movie Oru Vadakkan Veeragatha and Mathilukal. The film focuses on the prison life of Vaikom Muhammad Basheer and the love between him and Narayani, a female inmate of the prison, who remains unseen throughout the film. The movie was critically acclaimed and considered as the best classics of Malayalam Cinema. The movie has won four National Film Awards. When Indian Cinemas Completes 100 Years, Forbes included the performance of Mammootty in the list "25 Greatest Acting Performances of Indian Cinema". Mammootty appeared as Alexander in the 1990 in a Gangster film Samrajyam, Directed by Jomon with music composed by Ilaiyaraaja. The movie has commercially a major success at Kerala and Andhra Pradesh box-office. The movie has run for more than 200 days in Kerala and 400 days in Andhra Pradesh. In 1990, Mammootty was part of No.20 Madras Mail directed by Joshiy. Mammootty done a cameo role as himself and Mohanlal was in the lead role.

1991-1994
In 1991, he starred in Amaram, directed by Bharathan and written by A. K. Lohithadas. Mammootty played the character Achootty, an uneducated fisherman who wants his daughter to be educated and wants her to become a doctor. The role helped Mammootty to grab another Filmfare award for Best actor. In the same year he has done two Tamil films Thalapathi and Azhagan. Both the films were commercially successful. Thalapathi is adaptation from the Hindu Epic, Mahabharata. In the same year, Mammootty joined with I.V Sasi for two movies, Inspector Balram and Neelagiri. Inspector Balram was a sequel to his 1986 film Aavanazhi. The movie was commercially successful. In 1992, he acted with Kannada actor Vishnuvardhan in the action thriller movie Kauravar. Mammootty played the character Putturumees in the movie Soorya Manasam, who is a mentally challenged man who lives with his mother in a small village. Mammootty was critically acclaimed for the role and the movie is based on 1937 American Novel Of Mice and Men by John Steinbeck. Sowcar Janaki played the mother character. In the same year he acted in movie Pappayude Swantham Appoos, directed and written by Fazil. The movie explores the relationship between a father and son. The film was both commercial and critical success and ran for more than 200 days. Mammootty done his entry to Telugu industry through Swathi Kiranam in the year 1992.

In 1993, Mammootty joined with Joshiy for an Action film Dhruvam. It was Vikram debut in Malayalam Cinema. The film was a super hit at the box-office. He also won National Film Award for Best Actor for the movie Ponthan Mada and Vidheyan at the same year. In the year Mammootty done a Tamil movie Kilipetchu Ketkava, directed by Fazil. Mammootty made his Bollywood debut with the 1993 release Dhartiputra

1995-1999
In 1995, the combination of the writer Sreenivasan and director Kamal created the character Nandakumar Varma, who is a college professor in the romantic drama Mazhayethum Munpe. He acted as an aggressive yet honorable District Collector Thevalliparambil Joseph Alex IAS in his following release, a Political thriller film The King. It became the highest-grossing Malayalam film at that time. In the same year, he starred in the Tamil political thriller Makkal Aatchi, directed by R. K. Selvamani and produced by Thirupur A. Selvaraj under Aarthi International. The film's music was composed by Ilaiyaraaja. The film was also dubbed in Malayalam as Ente Naadu. The movie was clashed with Rajinikanth starrer Muthu at the same time and Mammootty took the lead over Rajinikanth in Tamil Nadu.  Mammootty's first Malayalam release of 1996 was Azhakiya Ravanan, a Romantic Drama directed by Kamal and written by Sreenivasan. The next film he acted in was Hitler written and directed by Siddique. The film was remade in Telugu under the same name in 1997, in Hindi as Krodh (2000), in Tamil as Military (2003), in Kannada as Varsha (2005) in Bengali as Dadar Adesh (2005). The film was a commercial success at the box office and was the highest grossing Malayalam movie, breaking his own movie record The King at that time. The movie has run over 300 days in theatres. He also did a direct Telugu movie in the same year Surya Putrulu, directed by C. Umamaheswara Rao. The film was a moderate success at the box office.

In 1997 Mammootty won the Best Actor Award in Filmfare Awards for the performance in the movie Bhoothakkannadi, directed by Lohithadas. It is considered as one of the finest performance in the actor career. In an interview, Mammootty revealed that he want to direct the movie with Rajinikanth in lead. In the same year Mammootty done two Tamil films Pudhayal, directed by Selva and Arasiyal, directed by R. K. Selvamani. In 1998, Mammootty played the role of an IPS officer in the investigation thriller film The Truth, written by S. N. Swamy and directed by Shaji Kailas. He played the lead role in Oru Maravathoor Kanavu, which was the directorial debut of Lal Jose in 1998. In the same year, he starred in Harikrishnans, co-starring Mohanlal and Juhi Chawla. The movie has two climaxes, and Shah Rukh Khan was supposed to do a pivotal role, but didn't happen due to unknown reasons. in the same year, Mammootty done a guest appearance in the Bollywood movie Swami Vivekananda, directed by G. V. Iyer.

In 1999, Mammootty won the Best Actor in National Film Awards for the movie Dr. Babasaheb Ambedkar, directed by Jabbar Patel. . The performance is considered as one of the finest one in his career. The movie is produced by National Film Development Corporation. Mammootty joined with Priyadarshan in the same year for the movie Megham, which is a commercial success.

2000-2009

In 2000, Mammootty done a cameo role in Narasimham, in which Mohanlal done the main role. The movie was huge success in boxoffice. With the huge success of Narasimham, director Shaji Kailas, joined with Mammootty in the same year for another action drama Valliettan. The movie was also a huge success in box office. 2000 was one of the best year for the actor in box office performance, after the huge success of Narasimham and Valliettan, Mammootty continued the success with the movies Dada Sahib and Tamil movie Kandukondain Kandukondain, co-starring Ajith. Both movies were blockbuster in box office. Mammootty won the Best Actor Award in Filmfare Awards in 2000 for his performance in Arayannangalude Veedu. He continued his box office reign in 2001 too. In the year, he began with Rakshasa Rajavu, directed by Vinayan. The movie was a huge success in box office. He has done the lead role in N. Lingusamy directorial debut Aanandham in the same year. The movie was a commercial and critical success.

In 2003, Mammootty played Sathyaprathapan, a bachelor in romantic comedy Drama Film Chronic Bachelor, directed by Siddique. The film received positive reviews and became a commercial success at the box office. Mammootty also acted in Pattalam, by director Lal Jose, in which he plays an Indian Army officer, Major Pattabhiraman. The movie made an average performance in the box office. In 2004, he acted in the third installment of CBI (film series), Sethurama Iyer CBI. The movie has become the second highest-grossing movie of the year. Mammootty won Kerala State Film Awards and Filmfare awards for Best Actor for the performance in the movie Kaazhcha. The movie was the directorial debut of Blessy. The movie got many critical receptions from all over. In the same year he appeared as a police officer in Ranjith (director) movie Black. The movie was a box office hit. After this action film, he appeared as a family man in Vesham, who sacrifice his life for his younger brother.

2005 was one of the best year for the actor in both box office and in performance. He was seen in never seen characters in the movies like Thommanum Makkalum, Thaskaraveeran and Rajamanikyam. In this, Rajamanikyam was industry hit. The movie has created and broke many records in the box office. The actor was seen in a never seen character. Other releases were Rappakal, Nerariyan CBI which is the fourth installment of CBI (film series) and Bus Conductor. These movies all made money in box office. The characters in each film were different in each others. The actor was totally controlling the box office in the year. In 2006, the actor continues his performance in box office and was utmost care in choosing the character. Mammootty started the year with action comedy film Thuruppugulan, which was a super hit in box office. The next release was Balram vs. Tharadas, which was the sequel of Athirathram and Inspector Balram. Katrina Kaif played the female lead in the movie and the only Malayalam movie she acted. At the end of the year actor changed to do off-beat movies such as Karutha Pakshikal and Palunku. The actor was nominated in the National Awards for Best actor at the year. He won the Best Actor in Filmfare Awards for the movie Karutha Pakshikal.

He started 2007 with the off-beat film Kaiyoppu. Then he back with the comedy action film Mayavi, directed by Shafi. The movie became the highest grosser in the state in the year. The next was Big B, which was the directorial debut of Amal Neerad. The movie was an average grosser in box office but still manages to completes more than 100 days in Kerala box office. After the release of the DVD of the movie the movie got many appreciation for the cinematography and editing. The movie redefined how to make a mass action movie to be made in Mollywood. Mammootty won the appreciation for the slow-motion walking and the background music is still trending. In the year the actor shown his box office and performance power in the movie Katha Parayumpol. He done an extended cameo role in the movie. The movie was remade in three languages, Kuselan in Tamil, Billu Barber in Hindi and Kathanayakudu. All the remakes failed in the respective box office. Mammootty was appraised for his performance in the movie.<ref>{{cite web |title=Mohanlal's 'Drishyam' to Mammootty's Katha Parayumpol' : Southern films that have been remade many times |website=News18 |url=https://www.news18.com/amp/photogallery/movies/mohanlals-drishyam-to-mammoottys-katha-parayumpol-southern-films-that-have-been-remade-many-times-1022255.html |access-date=13 July 2022 |archive-url=https://web.archive.org/web/20210624205419/https://www.news18.com/amp/photogallery/movies/mohanlals-drishyam-to-mammoottys-katha-parayumpol-southern-films-that-have-been-remade-many-times-1022255.html |archive-date=24 June 2021}}</ref>

He begin 2008 with action film Roudram, directed by Renji Panicker. Mammootty joined with Anwar Rasheed after the industrial hit RajaManikyam. This time for the comedy action movie Annan Thampi. The movie was a superhit in the boxoffice. The movie done a huge business all over. Telegu rights has sold for a record price until that time. His next releases were Parunthu, Mayabazar. He done a cameo role in One Way Ticket in which Prithviraj Sukumaran done the lead role. These movies didn't done any boxoffice wonders. After that he did the lead role in the biggest multistar movie in Malayalam Twenty:20, directed by Joshiy. In 2009, he done the all time blocbuster epic period drama film Kerala Varma Pazhassi Raja, written by M. T. Vasudevan Nair and directed by Hariharan. the film has collected around 49cr in box office. He also done performance oriented movies like Kerala Cafe and Paleri Manikyam. He won Best Actor Award in both Kerala State Film Awards and Filmfare Awards for the movie Paleri Manikyam. In the same year he done the action comedy film Chattambinadu, another performance oriented movie Loudspeaker and the directorial debut of Aashiq Abu, Daddy Cool. These movie has done Hit status in boxoffice.

2010–present

In the year 2010, Mammootty acted in the films Drona 2010, directed by Shaji Kailas, Yugapurushan, directed by R. Sukumaran, Pramaani, directed by B. Unnikrishnan, Pokkiri Raja, the directorial debut of Vysakh Abraham, Kutty Srank, directed by Shaji N. Karun, Pranchiyettan & the Saint, directed by Ranjith, Best of Luck, directed by M. A. Nishad and Best Actor, Martin Prakkat's debut film.

His films August 15, directed by Shaji Kailas, Doubles, directed by Sohan Seenulal, The Train, directed by Jayaraj, Bombay March 12, directed by Babu Janardhanan and Venicile Vyaapari, directed by Shafi appeared in 2011.

In 2012, his films included: The King & the Commissioner, directed by Shaji Kailas, the Kannada-Malayalam bilingual film Shikari directed by Abhaya Simha, Cobra, directed by Lal, Thappana, directed by Johny Antony, Jawan of Vellimala, directed by Anoop Kannan, (Mammootty produced the film), Face to Face, directed by V. M. Vinu and Bavuttiyude Namathil, directed by G. S. Vijayan.

His first films released in 2013 were Kammath & Kammath, directed by Thomson and Immanuel, directed by Lal Jose. Later, he went on to appear in Kadal Kadannoru Mathukkutty, directed by Ranjith, which was released for Ramzan season,  Kunjananthante Kada, directed by Salim Ahamed and Daivathinte Swantham Cleetus, directed by G. Marthandan. His next release was Silence, directed by V. K. Prakash.

He acted in Balyakalasakhi, directed by Pramod Payyannur, Praise the Lord, directed by Shibu Gangadharan and Gangster, directed by Aashiq Abu in the first half of 2014. He also acted in: Manglish, directed by Salam Bappu, Munnariyippu, directed by Venu, RajadhiRaja, directed by debutant Ajai Vasudev and Varsham, directed by Ranjith Sankar. Mammootty received critical praise for his portrayal of C.K. Raghavan in Munnariyippu, while Sify called RajadhiRaja "a genuine hit for Mammootty after a long time". Nicy V.P. of International Business Times wrote: "Varsham is a movie worth investing your time and money."

His 2015 releases were Fireman, directed by Deepu Karunakaran, Bhaskar the Rascal, directed by Siddique, a commercial success, Acha Dhin, directed by Marthandan. Utopiayile Rajavu, directed by Kamal and Pathemari, directed by Salim Ahamed.

He acted in Puthiya Niyamam alongside Nayanthara directed by A. K. Sajan in the first half of 2016. He also acted in Kasaba directed by debutant director Nithin Renji Paniker. His next releases for the year was White directed by Uday Ananthan and Thoppil Joppan, directed by Johny Antony marking their fourth collaboration.

In 2017, his first release was The Great Father directed by debutant Haneef Adeni. He was then seen in Puthan Panam directed by Ranjith, Pullikkaran Staraa directed by Syamdhar and Masterpiece directed by Ajai Vasudev.

In 2018, he acted in Parole directed by debutant Sharrath Sandith. He has then seen in Uncle written by Joy Mathew and directed by debutant Girish Damodar. His next release was Abrahaminte Santhathikal, a crime thriller directed by debutant Shaji Padoor. His last release for the year was Oru Kuttanadan Blog directed and written by Sethu. In 2018, he acted in critically acclaimed Tamil movie Peranbu directed by Ram. It was selected for Rotterdam Film Festival, Shanghai International Film Festival and International Film Festival of India. His role of single parent Amudhavan who struggles with raising his spastic girl child, Paapa was well appreciated by critics.

His first release of 2019 was Madhura Raja, a spin-off to the 2010 film Pokkiri Raja directed by Vysakh. It becomes the best-grossing film in Mammootty's career. His next release was Unda directed by Khalid Rahman in which he played the role of a Sub-inspector of Police who led the team of a police unit for state election duty in a Maoist prone area in Chhattisgarh. He was then seen in an extended cameo in the film Pathinettam Padi directed by Shankar Ramakrishnan. Later in the year, Mammootty was in the historical drama Mamangam directed by M. Padmakumar, which is based on the historical Mamankam festival in the banks of the Bharathappuzha. He was also in Ramesh Pisharody's  Ganagandharvan in which he plays a ‘ganamela’ singer named Kalasadhan Ullas and Ajai Vasudev's Shylock. After two decades, Mammootty returned to Telugu cinema in 2019 with the biopic Yatra which is based on former Andhra Pradesh chief minister YS Rajasekhar Reddy directed by Mahi Raghav.

In 2021, Mammootty has two releases in March; the first is The Priest, directed by Jofin T. Chacko. The film also features Manju Warrier in the lead role. The second is One, a political thriller film directed by Santhosh Vishwanath. He plays Kadakkal Chandran, Chief Minister of Kerala in the film.

In 2022, The first release was Bheeshma Parvam directed by Amal Neerad, which received positive responses and was a blockbuster. Currently the actor has a long line up including CBI 5: The Brain, Bilal- Sequel of Big B, and Nanpakal Nerathu Mayakkam. In 2021, he acted in the Telugu movie Agent starring Akhil Akkineni.

Films in other languages
He has acted in Tamil films for directors including K. Balachander's (Azhagan), Mani Ratnam's (Thalapathy), Fazil's (Kilippechu Kekkavaa), N. Linguswamy's (Aanandham), R. K. Selvamani's (Makkal Aatchi), Marumalarchi Bharathi's (Marumalarchi) and Ethirum Puthirum and Rajiv Menon (Kandukondain Kandukondain) (2000). He played Anantha Sharma in K. Viswanath's Telugu film Swathi Kiranam (1992).

 Other work 

During the 1980s, Mammootty was the co-owner of a production company, Casino, along with Mohanlal, I.V. Sasi, Seema and Century Kochumon. The films it produced included Nadodikkattu (1987), Gandhinagar 2nd Street (1986), Adiyozhukkukal and Karimpin Poovinakkare. He formed a television production company, Megabytes, which produced television serials, the first being Jwalayay in the late 1990s, which was also his first project as a producer.

Mammootty also owns a distribution company named Mammootty Technotainment. He is the owner of Playhouse since 2009, a company which primarily distributes films he has starred in. It has since ventured into film production, with ventures including the Jawan of Vellimala and Street Lights. As of 2010, he is the chairman of Malayalam Communications, which runs some Malayalam TV channels such as Kairali TV, People TV and Channel We. In 2021, he founded another production company, the Mammootty Kampany, which produced the films Rorschach (2022) and Nanpakal Nerathu Mayakkam (2022).

He has stated he has no political ambitions. In 2007, Mammootty published his first book, Kazhchapadu (roughly translated as "Perspective"), a compilation of short essays he had written in various publications over the years. That year, he and Dubai-based businessman MA Yousuf Ali lobbied for the proposed Smart City project at Kochi with officials of the Dubai Internet City (DIC).

 Philanthropic and social causes 
Mammootty is a patron of the Pain and Palliative Care Society, a charitable organisation in Kerala, that aims to improve the quality of people in advanced stages of cancer. He has been working with the Pain and Palliative Care Centre situated in Kozhikode, India. In 2018, he put forth a project to provide the pain and palliative care to those suffering from cancer throughout Kerala. He is also a patron of the Care and Share International Foundation, a charity organisation aimed at reducing societal inequality. Among its endeavours, the foundation mobilised financial help for the heart surgeries of children with the Hridaya Sparsham project. A fundraiser over social networking sites supported by Mammootty raised about 1 crore within a day.

Mammootty is the goodwill ambassador of the charity project Street India Movement, which lists the elimination of child begging and child labour among its goals. He has promoted the activities of the movement, which coordinates with orphanages and institutions looking after the children. He is also goodwill ambassador for Akshaya, the information technology dissemination project of the Government of Kerala.Mammootty as brand ambassador has helped Akshaya gain publicity . The Hindu. 3 November 2006. Retrieved 30 October 2007. He formally took over the role on 26 February 2006 at a video-telecasted programme that was linked to all district headquarters of the state. He also promotes the anti-drug campaign Addicted to Life, launched by the Government of Kerala and affiliated with the Kerala State Beverages Corporation, which aims to eradicate drugs and alcohol usage among people, especially the youth.

In August 2014, Mammootty launched the My Tree Challenge, modeled after the Ice Bucket Challenge, which purports to encourage others to plant saplings, as the rules dictate that they should if challenged. The challenge was created by Abdul Manaf, an entrepreneur, and Imthias Kadeer, a travel photographer. Mammootty challenged Mohanlal and Shah Rukh Khan to take up the challenge. Kazhcha, organised by Mammootty Fans Welfare Association and Mammootty Times, in association with Little Flower Hospital and Research Centre and the Eye Bank Association of Kerala, is a venture to extend free eye care and treatment. One of the major activities related to this is the distribution of free spectacles to children. A special fund received from the office of the President of India will be utilised for this purpose. Free eye camps will also be conducted at various places in connection with this project.

 Media image and artistry 

Unlike other Indian film industries, which saw the emergence of superstars that commanded a great degree of fame and stardom post-Indian independence, Malayalam cinema historically focused on stories that dealt with the lives of ordinary people, and did not generally have superstars, with the possible exception of Prem Nazir. This changed in the 1980s with the growing popularity of Mammootty and Mohanlal. Sreedhar Pillai of India Today wrote in December 1988, "So impregnable is their hold over the industry today that new films are launched only if they have the time."

In 2005, films starring Mammootty, Mohanlal and Dileep accounted for 97 percent of the box office revenue of Malayalam cinema. During the 2006 IIFA Awards ceremony held at Dubai, he openly criticised the organizers of the IIFA Awards for completely ignoring South Indian film by stating that the Bollywood film industry should stand up to competition from the South Indian film industry before calling itself international.

In 2013, his role in Mathilukal was listed among the "25 Greatest Acting Performances of Indian Cinema" by Forbes India on the occasion of celebrating 100 years of Indian Cinema.

Mammootty was appointed as the brand ambassador of the Thrissur-based South Indian Bank on 16 October 2006.South Indian Bank has appointed Padmasree Bharat Mammootty as Brand Ambassador. moneycontrol.com. 16 October 2006. Retrieved 30 October 2007. He was also featured as the brand ambassador for Kerala Volleyball League.

Filmography

 Discography 

Accolades

Mammootty has won three National Film Awards, seven Kerala State Film Awards, thirteen Filmfare Awards, eleven Kerala Film Critics Awards and five Asianet Film Awards (from fourteen nominations). In 1998, the government of India honoured Mammootty with its fourth highest civilian award, Padma Shri for his contribution to the Indian film industry. He was conferred with the Doctor of Letters degree by the University of Calicut and the University of Kerala in 2010. In 2022, he was the honoured with Kerala Prabha, the second-highest award given by the Government of Kerala.

National Film Awards
 1999: National Film Award for Best Actor for Dr. Babasaheb Ambedkar 1994: National Film Award for Best Actor for Vidheyan and Ponthan Mada 1989: National Film Award for Best Actor for Oru Vadakkan Veeragatha and Mathilukal''

References

External links

 
 

1951 births
Living people
Male actors from Kerala
Film people from Kerala
Film producers from Kerala
Television personalities from Kerala
Male actors from Kottayam
Indian humanitarians
Maharaja's College, Ernakulam alumni
Male actors in Hindi cinema
Male actors in Kannada cinema
Male actors in Malayalam cinema
Male actors in Tamil cinema
Male actors in Telugu cinema
Indian male film actors
Malayalam film producers
Indian television producers
Indian television presenters
Recipients of the Padma Shri in arts
Best Actor National Film Award winners
Kerala State Film Award winners
Filmfare Awards South winners
20th-century Indian male actors
21st-century Indian male actors
20th-century Indian businesspeople
21st-century Indian businesspeople
Kerala Prabha Award Winners